Vērgale Palace is a palace in Vērgale Parish, South Kurzeme Municipality, in the Courland region of Latvia. Originally built in the 18th century, it was remodeled for the owner Baron von Behr in 1837. The building currently houses the Vērgale school.

See also
List of palaces and manor houses in Latvia

References

Palaces in Latvia
South Kurzeme Municipality
Courland